Armando Torres Chibrás is an orchestra conductor at Pershing Middle School, with extended activities as scholar, lecturer, academic jury, author and arts leader born in Mexico City. He is currently Head of the Orchestral Academy Program of El Sistema-Mexico (Sistema Nacional de Fomento Musical), an agency of the National Council for Culture and the Arts of Mexico.

Torres Chibrás has guest-conducted some of the Mexican leading orchestras, including the National Symphony Orchestra of Mexico, the Querétaro Philharmonic Orchestra (Orquesta Filarmónica del Estado de Querétaro), the UNAM Philharmonic Orchestra (OFUNAM), the IPN Symphony Orchestra, the State of Michoacán Symphony, the State of Puebla Symphony Orchestra, the Toluca Philharmonic, the Symphony Orchestra of the Autonomous University of the State of Hidalgo, the University of Guanajuato Symphony Orchestra, the Camerata of Querétaro Philharmonic, the Fine Arts Chamber Orchestra, or the Carlos Chávez Youth Symphony Orchestra. Torres Chibrás is as well the author of "José Pablo Moncayo: Mexico´s Musical Crest, " a biography of the Mexican conductor and composer of the celebrated orchestral fantasy "Huapango" for orchestra.

Publications

Bibliography
Armando Torres Chibrás.   José Pablo Moncayo: Mexico's Musical Crest. Cologne: LAP Lambert Academic Publishing, 2009.

References

External links

 Armando Torres Chibrás official website

Living people
Year of birth missing (living people)
Musicians from Mexico City
Mexican conductors (music)
Male conductors (music)
21st-century conductors (music)
National Conservatory of Music of Mexico alumni
Maastricht Academy of Music alumni
HEC Montréal alumni
University of Missouri–Kansas City alumni
21st-century male musicians